Adrift is a 2009 Vietnamese film directed by Bui Thac Chuyen and stars Linh Dan Pham, Do Thi Hai Yen, Johnny Tri Nguyen and Nguyen Duy Khoa. Hai Yen plays Duyen, a young tourist guide who marries Hai (Duy Khoa), a taxi driver, but her friend and writer Cam (Linh Dan) still has feelings for her. The film deals with issues in modern Vietnam such as homosexuality and loneliness of the young generation. The film is a co-production between Feature Film Studio n°1 (Vietnam) and Acrobates Films (France).

Adrift was selected to participate in the Venice Film Festival, Toronto International Film Festival and Bangkok International Film Festival. At the 66th Venice International Film Festival, FIPRESCI awarded Adrift with its prize for young directors and cinemas. At the Cines del Sur Festival 2010, the film won the NETPAC award.

Plot
Set in modern Hanoi, Adrift begins with the wedding of Duyen and Hai. Duyen is a beautiful tourist guide and translator who marries Hai, a taxi driver who is two years her junior. Duyen thinks the marriage will make her happy but it turns out more difficult, especially since her childlike husband is uninterested in her efforts of intimacy and the marriage remains unconsummated.  Cam, secretly in love with Duyen, is bitter about the marriage.  Cam has Duyen deliver a letter to Tho, a handsome lothario and tourist guide who physically hurls himself on Duyen when she visits his home to deliver the letter. After Tho reports back to Cam that Duyen is sexually inexperienced, Cam diabolically persuades Duyen to take a temporary job as a translator on one of Tho's beach tours, knowing what will happen. Duyen's time at the beach with Tho results in an affair leading to Duyen's sexual awakening but continued uncertainty about herself, marriage, and life.

Cast
 Do Thi Hai Yen as Duyen (Duyên)
 Linh Dan Pham as Cam (Cầm)
 Johnny Tri Nguyen as Tho (Thổ)
 Nguyen Duy Khoa as Hai (Hải)

References

External links
 

2009 LGBT-related films
2009 films
Vietnamese-language films
Vietnamese LGBT-related films
Lesbian-related films